The  San Salvador blind snake (Epictia columbi) is a species of snake in the family Leptotyphlopidae. The species is native to the Caribbean.

Etymology
The specific name, columbi, is in honor of Genoese explorer Christopher Columbus.

Geographic range
E. columbi is endemic to San Salvador Island in The Bahamas.

Habitat
The preferred natural habitats of E. columbi are forest and shrubland.

Description
It has 14 scale rows. The rostral and head are brown. The body is black to blackish brown dorsally (11 scale rows), and reddish brown to yellowish brown ventrally (3 scale rows).

Diet
E. columbi preys upon termites.

Reproduction
E. columbi is oviparous.

References

Further reading
Adalsteinsson SA, Branch WR, Trape S, Vitt LJ, Hedges SB (2009). "Molecular phylogeny, classification, and biogeography of snakes of the family Leptotyphlopidae (Reptilia, Squamata)". Zootaxa 2244: 1–50. (Epictia columbi, new combination).
Klauber LM (1939). "Three New Worm Snakes of the Genus Leptotyphlops  ". Transactions of the San Diego Society of Natural History 9 (14): 59–65. (Leptotyphlops columbi, new species, pp. 62–64 + Figures 3a & 3b on p. 65).
Schwartz A, Henderson RW (1991). Amphibians and Reptiles of the West Indies: Descriptions, Distributions, and Natural History. Gainesville, Florida: University of Florida Press. 720 pp. . (Leptotyphlops columbi, p. 618).
Wallach V, Williams KL, Boundy J (2014). Snakes of the World: A Catalogue of Living and Extinct Species. Boca Raton, Florida: CRC Press, Taylor & Francis Group. 1,237 pp. . (Epictia columbi, p. 276).

Epictia
Reptiles described in 1939